Straight Outta Compton: N.W.A 10th Anniversary Tribute is a tribute album to the American Compton-based hip hop group N.W.A, released through Priority Records in 1998 on the tenth anniversary of the group's debut studio album Straight Outta Compton. It is composed of twelve of the thirteen songs in the order identical to the original, covered by N.W.A. members' affiliates, such as Ice Cube's Westside Connection groupmates WC and Mack 10 along with Hoo-Bangin' Records labelmates Allfrumtha I, Boo Kapone, MC Eiht and The Comrads, Eazy-E's protégés Gangsta Dresta and Bone Thugs-n-Harmony, and Dr. Dre's long time partner Snoop Dogg with Snoop's allies C-Murder and Silkk the Shocker, and Aftermath Ent. signee King Tee, as well as several other fellow rappers, including Ant Banks, Jayo Felony, J Dubb, Mr. Mike, Big Pun, Cuban Link and Fat Joe. Production was mostly handled by Ant Banks, as well as Craig B. of Beats by the Pound, Krayzie Bone, Dr. Dre and DJ Yella, with Andrew M. Shack and Marvin Watkins served as executive producers. The album peaked at number 142 on the Billboard 200 and 31 on the Top R&B/Hip-Hop Albums chart in the United States. Music video was shot for the title track.

Track listing

Charts

References

External links

Tribute albums
1998 compilation albums
Albums produced by Dr. Dre
Hip hop compilation albums
Albums produced by DJ Yella
Albums produced by Ant Banks
Priority Records compilation albums